110 (one hundred [and] ten) is the natural number following 109 and preceding 111.

In mathematics
110 is a sphenic number and a pronic number. Following the prime quadruplet (101, 103, 107, 109), at 110, the Mertens function reaches a low of −5.

110 is the sum of three consecutive squares, .

RSA-110 is one of the RSA numbers, large semiprimes that are part of the RSA Factoring Challenge.

In base 10, the number 110 is a Harshad number and a self number.

In science

 The atomic number of darmstadtium.

In religion

 According to the Bible, the figures Joseph and Joshua both died at the age of 110.

In sports
Olympic male track and field athletics run 110 metre hurdles. (Female athletes run the 100 metre hurdles instead.)

The International 110, or the 110, is a one-design racing sailboat designed in 1939 by C. Raymond Hunt.

In other fields
110 is also:
 The year AD 110 or 110 BC
 A common name for mains electricity in North America, despite the nominal voltage actually being 120 V (range 110–120 V). Normally spoken as "one-ten".
 1-1-0, the emergency telephone number used to reach police services in Iran, Germany, Estonia, China, Indonesia, and Japan. Also used to reach the fire and rescue services in Norway and Turkey.
 The age a person must attain in order to be considered a supercentenarian.
 A card game related to Forty-five (card game).
 A percentage in the expression "To give 110%", meaning to give a little more effort than one's maximum effort
 The number of stories of each of the towers of the former World Trade Center in New York.
 The number of stories (by common reckoning) of the Sears Tower in Chicago.
 The TCP port used for POP3 email protocol
 A 110 block is a type of punch block used to connect sets of wires in a structured cabling system.
 The abjad (ابجد) translation of word "علی" (Ali) in Arabic and Persian.
 It is also known as "eleventy", a term made famous by linguist and author J. R. R. Tolkien (Bilbo Baggins celebrates his eleventy-first birthday at the beginning of The Lord of the Rings) and derived from the Old English . When the word eleventy is used, it may indicate the exact number (110), or more commonly an indefinite large number such as gazillion.  
 Eleventy is used in the comic reading of a phone number in the Irish TV series "The Savage Eye" by  Dave McSavage playing an opiate user advertising life insurance.
 Lowest number to not be considered a favorite by anyone among 44,000 people surveyed in a 2014 online poll and subsequently adopted by British television show QI as the show's favourite number in 2017.

See also
 110s decade
 List of highways numbered 110
 List of 110th Street, New York City Subway stations
 110 film

References

Integers